Swanpool may refer to:
Swanpool, Victoria, Australia
Swanpool, Cornwall, UK, a nature reserve beach and lake
Swanpool, Devon, UK, a coastal nature reserve
Swanpool, Lincoln, UK, a suburb of Lincoln
Swanpool Wood and Furnace Grove, an SSSI in the Wye Valley, Gloucestershire
Swanpool, a location in Battle Realms